Cytohesin-4 is a protein that in humans is encoded by the CYTH4 gene.

This gene encodes a member of the cytohesin (CYTH) family, formerly known as the PSCD (pleckstrin homology, Sec7 and coiled-coil domains) family. Members of this family have identical structural organization that consists of an N-terminal coiled-coil motif, a central Sec7 domain, and a C-terminal pleckstrin homology (PH) domain. The coiled-coil motif is involved in homodimerization, the Sec7 domain contains guanine-nucleotide exchange protein (GEP) activity, and the PH domain interacts with phospholipids and is responsible for association of CYTHs with membranes. Members of this family appear to mediate the regulation of protein sorting and membrane trafficking. CYTH4 exhibits GEP activity in vitro with both ARF1 and ARF5 but is inactive with ARF6. The CYTH4 and CYTH1 gene structures are very similar.

References

Further reading